Rosewood Bangkok is a luxury hotel within Bangkok's central business district along Ploenchit Road, managed by Rosewood Hotels & Resorts. The hotel features 158 guestrooms, three restaurants, a roof bar and conference rooms. It was designed by Kohn Pedersen Fox with Tandem Architects as executive architect and Celia Chu Design Associates as interior designer. The building provides direct access to the adjacent Phloen Chit BTS station.

References

 Rosewood Bangkok Opens
 https://www.traveldailymedia.com/rosewood-bangkok-announce-launch/ 

Hotels in Bangkok
Skyscrapers in Bangkok
Kohn Pedersen Fox buildings
Hotels established in 2019
Hotel buildings completed in 2019